The canton of Ingwiller is an administrative division of the Bas-Rhin department, northeastern France. Created at the French canton reorganisation, which came into effect in March 2015, it has its seat in Ingwiller.

It consists of the following communes:

Adamswiller
Altwiller
Asswiller
Baerendorf
Berg
Bettwiller
Bischholtz
Bissert
Burbach
Bust
Butten
Dehlingen
Diedendorf
Diemeringen
Domfessel
Dossenheim-sur-Zinsel
Drulingen
Durstel
Erckartswiller
Eschbourg
Eschwiller
Eywiller
Frohmuhl
Gœrlingen
Gungwiller
Harskirchen
Herbitzheim
Hinsbourg
Hinsingen
Hirschland
Ingwiller
Keskastel
Kirrberg
Lichtenberg
Lohr
Lorentzen
Mackwiller
Menchhoffen
Mulhausen
Neuwiller-lès-Saverne
Niedersoultzbach
Oermingen
Ottwiller
Petersbach
La Petite-Pierre
Pfalzweyer
Puberg
Ratzwiller
Rauwiller
Reipertswiller
Rexingen
Rimsdorf
Rosteig
Sarre-Union
Sarrewerden
Schillersdorf
Schœnbourg
Schopperten
Siewiller
Siltzheim
Sparsbach
Struth
Thal-Drulingen
Tieffenbach
Vœllerdingen
Volksberg
Waldhambach
Weinbourg
Weislingen
Weiterswiller
Weyer
Wimmenau
Wingen-sur-Moder
Wolfskirchen
Zittersheim

References

Cantons of Bas-Rhin